Ernest C. Gaston Electric Generating Plant is a coal and natural gas-fired electrical generation facility near Wilsonville, Shelby County, Alabama.

Four of the five units in the plant were converted to use natural gas under plans to reduce costs.

References

External links 
 Data on generation and fuel consumption from the Energy Information Administration Electricity Data Browser

Coal-fired power stations in Alabama
Natural gas-fired power stations in Alabama
Alabama Power